Turkey Brook Park is located within Mount Olive Township, in Morris County, New Jersey on Flanders Road next to the Chester M. Stephens Elementary School.

Mount Olive Township's Grand Opening of the park was held on July 19, 2003.

Geography
Turkey Brook Park is  designed for passive recreation, local sports, walking, hiking and fishing. The Park is equipped with 1 full size turf and lighted Soccer field + 3 full size grass Soccer Fields,  2 Baseball Fields, 2 Softball Field, and 1 Football Field.

The Mount Olive Dog Park is located in Turkey Brook Park. The grand opening leash cutting ceremony was held October 21, 2007

History

The Seward Mansion is located at the entrance to Turkey Brook Park.  The mansion was built in 1858 by Beulah and Henry Seward. The mansion had 9 large rooms, a grand staircase at its center, chandeliers, ornate mantels and a wrap-around porch. Architecturally, it is an example of 18th century stone construction in a mid-Victorian style.

The building is currently undergoing renovation efforts by the Mount Olive Historical Society.

References

External links
 Mount Olive Township

Parks in Morris County, New Jersey
Parks in New Jersey
Dog parks in the United States